Hunter Ripley Rawlings III (born December 14, 1944) is an American classics scholar and academic administrator. He is best known for serving as the 17th President of the University of Iowa from 1987 until 1995 and as the 10th President of Cornell University from 1995 until 2003. He also served as Cornell's interim president in 2005–2006 and again from 2016–2017. Currently, Rawlings is Professor and University President Emeritus at the Department of Classics.

Rawlings served as president of the Association of American Universities from June 1, 2011, until April 2016. He has served as chair of both the Association of American Universities and the Ivy Council of Presidents. He is a member of the American Academy of Arts and Sciences, and he serves on the boards of the American School of Classical Studies in Athens, Haverford College, and the National Academy Foundation.

Early life, family and career
Originally from Norfolk, Virginia, Rawlings received his B.A. with honors in classics from Haverford College in 1966. From there he moved to Princeton University, where he received a Ph.D. in classics in 1970. After graduating from Princeton, he joined the faculty at the University of Colorado at Boulder, rising to full professor in 1980. Rawlings began his career in academic administration at Colorado, serving as chairman of the classics department and later as associate vice chancellor for instruction. In 1988, Rawlings was named president of the University of Iowa, a position he held until 1995. Rawlings only notable action at Iowa involved racial undertones after ruling freshman sensation Ray Thompson ineligible for the 1989 NCAA tournament, despite being eligible under NCAA requirements. Rawlings is married to Elizabeth T. Rawlings (née Trapnell), who is a professional translator with a master's degree in French from the University of North Carolina and a Master of Fine Arts degree in Literary Translation from the University of Iowa. She has translated and collaborated in translating a number of books from French to English, particularly in the fields of Greek and Latin literature and ancient history. The Rawlingses have four children and five grandchildren. His eldest daughter, also Elizabeth, works for the Department of Homeland Security and his eldest son, Hunter Rawlings IV is New York Times Bestselling author and a former U.S. Marine Corps reconnaissance officer.

President of Cornell University
Rawlings came to Cornell University, becoming its 10th president, serving from 1995 until 2003. At Cornell, he was an effective fundraiser, presiding over several large capital campaigns. Rawlings created several new positions and programs to support undergraduate education, began the construction of several new dormitories, centralized the location of freshmen on campus (initially protested by Al Sharpton and others due to alleged racial implications), and promoted stronger undergraduate admissions standards. Rawlings began initiatives in certain areas of science and engineering that he considered especially important to the future (such as bioinformatics, computational biology, computer and information sciences, genomics, and materials science), and began plans for Weill Hall, a large new life sciences building which houses the Weill Institute for Cell and Molecular Biology. He encouraged interdisciplinary exchanges in the humanities and social sciences. He also presided over an agreement to establish a branch of Cornell's medical school in Qatar, the Weill Cornell Medical College in Qatar.

While President of Cornell, Rawlings also held the rank of professor of classics, and continued to hold this position after he left the presidency. Notably, during the last two years of his presidency, he taught an undergraduate course in classics. At the same time, Rawlings faced criticism from many students and alumni leaders for his hands-off approach toward the student body and his focus on the business operations of Cornell.

After the sudden resignation of his successor as president, Jeffrey Lehman, effective June 30, 2005, Rawlings agreed to reassume the presidency on an interim basis until a permanent replacement could be found. On January 21, 2006, David J. Skorton was announced as the next president of Cornell. Skorton took office on July 1. (Like Rawlings, Skorton was previously President of the University of Iowa.)

After the sudden passing of Skorton's successor, President Elizabeth Garrett, in March 2016, Rawlings was appointed interim president. He began on April 25, 2016.

Research
Rawlings' research focuses on Greek history and historiography. His scholarly publications include a book, The Structure of Thucydides' History (Princeton University Press, 1981).

Notes

External links
 Cornell Presidency: Hunter R. Rawlings III
 Cornell University Library Presidents Exhibition: Hunter Ripley Rawlings III (Presidency; Inauguration)
 Hunter Rawlings Interview

American philologists
Presidents of Cornell University
Cornell University Department of History faculty
Princeton University alumni
Haverford College alumni
Presidents of the University of Iowa
1944 births
Living people
People from Norfolk, Virginia
Presidents of the Association of American Universities